Mount Vulture is an extinct volcano located  north of the city Potenza in the Basilicata region (Italy). As a prominent landmark it gave its name to the Vulture region, the most significant viticultural zone in Basilicata growing the DOC wine Aglianico del Vulture.

At the summit is a caldera, known as Valle dei Grigi, whose precise origins are disputed.

Volcanic history 
The earliest eruptions of the volcano occurred around one million years ago, explosive activity producing ignimbrite. The explosive eruption phase finished around 830,000 years before present, when the nature of the activity changed to a mix of pyroclastic and effusive, lava eruptions which built up the mountain and which have been dated to around 500,000 years ago. One of the explanations advanced for the Valle dei Grigi is that it is the result of the collapse of a sector of the mountain, as occurred during the 1980 eruption of Mount St. Helens and the 1792 eruption of Mount Unzen.

The most recent phase involved further lava flows and the growth of lava domes in the Valle dei Grigi, including the formation of two calderas. The most recent activity is thought to have been phreatomagmatic explosions around 40 ka ago which produced maars and small cold surges (pyroclastic surges cooler than 100 °C).

See also
Vulture region
Monticchio
List of volcanoes in Italy

External links

 "Mount Vulture volcano, Italy." Italy's Volcanoes: The Cradle of Volcanology, website by Boris Behncke

Further reading
Crisci G, de Fino M, La Volpe L & Rapisardi L (1983) Pleistocene ignimbrites of Monte Vulture (Basilicata, Southern Italy). Neues Jahrbuch füer Geologie und Paläontologie Monatshefte 12: 731–746.
Guest JE, Duncan AM & Chester DK (1988) Monte Vulture Volcano (Basilicata, Italy): an analysis of morphology and volcaniclastic facies. Bulletin of Volcanology 50: 244–257.
La Volpe L, Patella D, Rapisardi L & Tramacere A (1984) The evolution of the Monte Vulture volcano (Southern Italy): inferences from volcanological, geological and deep dipole electrical soundings data. Journal of Volcanology a Geothermal Research 22: 147–162.
La Volpe L & Principe C (1991) Comments on Guest et al. (1988) and Reply by Guest et al.. Bulletin of Volcanology 53: 222–229.

Stratovolcanoes of Italy
Campanian volcanic arc
Calderas of Italy
Maars of Italy
Extinct volcanoes
Pleistocene stratovolcanoes
Mountains of Basilicata
Mountains of the Apennines
One-thousanders of Italy